Butet Manurung or Saur Marlina Manurung (born in Jakarta, February 21, 1972) is a pioneer for alternative education for indigenous people in isolated and remote areas in Indonesia. Like other young Batak girls, she was called "Butet". Therefore, she is well known as Butet Manurung.

She initiated the first pilot school in Orang Rimba society (or Suku Kubu), a tribe who live in Bukit Dua Belas National Park, Jambi, Sumatra. The method that she used was half anthropology, meaning that the teaching of reading, writing and counting were conducted while living with her pupils for several months. This system was combined by taking into consideration daily behavior pattern of the respected society.

Once it had been systematically structured, she developed the Sokola Rimba system. The term "Sokola Rimba" was derived from the local language that is used by Orang Rimba, one of multiple dialects in Melayu languages. The Sokola Rimba system is now used in several remote areas across Indonesia, such as in Halmahera and Flores. The Government of the Republic of Indonesia is planning to adopt this system in order for further development for communities that have particular conditions.

On June 5, 2010, she married Kelvin James Milne in Canberra, Australia.

References

External links
Butet Manurung, A Woman of Letters
Butet Manurung, champion of literacy

1972 births
Living people
Indonesian Christians
People of Batak descent
People from Jakarta